The Rivière Pot au Beurre is a tributary of the Yamaska River. It flows northeast through the municipalities of Sainte-Victoire-de-Sorel, Sorel-Tracy and Yamaska in the Pierre-De Saurel Regional County Municipality (MRC), in the administrative region of Montérégie, on the South Shore of Saint Lawrence River, in Quebec, Canada.

Geography 
The main neighboring hydrographic slopes of the Pot-au-Beurre river are:
 North side: Yamaska River, lake Saint-Pierre;
 East side: Lemoine River, Yamaska River;
 South side: Lemoine River, Petite rivière Bellevue, Salvail River;
 West side: Richelieu River.

Its source is located in an agricultural zone at the confluence of the Lemoine river (coming from the south-east) and the Benoit stream (coming from the south-west).

Course from the source (segment of )

In this first segment, the river is bordered by Chemin du Rang Fleury (to the east) and Chemin du Rang Nord (to the west).

Course downstream of route 239 (segment of )

In this second segment, the river is bordered by Chemin Sainte-Victoire (to the east) and Chemin du Rang Nord (to the west).

Course downstream of route 132 (segment of )

The "Rivière Pot au Beurre" empties on the west bank of the Yamaska River, at the height of the northern tip of Île Saint-Jean.

The basin has dense and artificialized ramifications . They are an indicator of the impermeability of the soil, which requires drainage, given that it is located in an area where agriculture is practiced intensively. The majority of its tributaries are straightened agricultural ditches .

Toponymy 

The origin of this toponym remains ambiguous. In the past, in summer, residents used to keep their butter in a cool place in a container called a "butter pot", by immersing it in wells or the waters of this river, especially in deeper pits or in pits. cold source areas. The cartographer Joseph Bouchette designated this watercourse "Rivière Pot au Beurre" in his "Topographical Description of the Province of Lower Canada (1815)".

In Quebec, another river bears the name "Pot au Beurre". The latter flows at the limit of the municipalities of Saint-Pierre-de-l'Île-d'Orléans and Sainte-Famille on the island of Orleans. This Orleans toponym is indicated in 1722 in the delimitation of the parish of Sainte-Famille. Known variants: "Première rivière Pot au Beurre"; "Ruisseau du Dragage".

The toponym "Rivière Pot-au-Beurre" was officially registered on December 5, 1968, at the Commission de toponymie du Québec.

See also 

 List of rivers of Quebec

References

Bibliography
 

Rivers of Montérégie
Pierre-De Saurel Regional County Municipality